Michael Dean Bishop (born March 18, 1967) is an American attorney and politician who was the U.S. representative for  from 2015 to 2019. He is a member of the Republican Party. He previously served in the Michigan House of Representatives from 1999 to 2003, and the Michigan State Senate from 2003 to 2010 where he served as majority leader.

Bishop lost his reelection bid in the 2018 midterm elections to Democratic nominee Elissa Slotkin.

Early life, education, and career
Bishop graduated from Rochester Adams High School, and graduated from University of Michigan in 1989. He received a J.D. from Michigan State University College of Law. Bishop worked at the law firm of Booth Patterson until 2002. He later became a senior attorney at Simon, Galasso & Frantz. Bishop is also a licensed real estate broker and has owned two local real estate businesses, Freedom Realty, Inc. and Pro Management, Inc. Bishop is a member of the American Bar Association, State Bar of Michigan, District of Columbia Bar, Bar of the Supreme Court of the United States, Oakland County Bar Association, Michigan Association of Realtors, and National Association of Realtors.

Bishop served on the Municipal Law and Business Law committees of the Oakland County Bar Association and is a member of the National Association of Sportsmen Legislators. Following his time in the Michigan Legislature, Bishop worked as chief legal officer for International Bancard Corporation and taught at Thomas M. Cooley Law School. Prior to his election in the 45th District, Bishop unsuccessfully campaigned for a University of Michigan Board of Regents position in 1996.

Michigan legislature

Michigan House of Representatives 
Bishop served in the Michigan State House from 1999 to 2002 representing the 45th District, which covered much of the same territory where his father, Donald Bishop, had served. During his four-year tenure in the Michigan House, he served as vice chairman of the Commerce Committee.

Michigan Senate 
Bishop was elected to the State Senate in 2002 to represent the 12th district, a seat which had previously been held by his father. He served until term limits prevented him from seeking re-election in 2010. Before his time as majority leader, Bishop was chosen to be chairman of the Banking and Financial Institutions Committee and vice chairman of both the Gaming and Casino Oversight Committee and Judiciary Committee.

Majority Leader 

Bishop was the Senate Majority Leader from 2007-2010.

At the State Republican Party Convention in 2010, Bishop unsuccessfully bid for the Republican nomination for state attorney general. He ran for Oakland County prosecutor in 2012, but lost to Democratic incumbent Jessica R. Cooper.

U.S. House of Representatives

Elections

2014 

On November 4, 2014, Bishop defeated Democratic challenger Eric Schertzing for Michigan's 8th congressional district.

Bishop was sworn in on January 6, 2015. Shortly after being sworn in, he voted for John Boehner as Speaker.

2016 

Bishop successfully ran for re-election in 2016. He ran unopposed in the Republican primary. Two Democrats, actress Melissa Gilbert and Linda Keefe, filed to run in the Democratic primary election. Gilbert later withdrew. Gilbert was replaced with Democratic challenger Suzanna Shkreli late in the race in July, 2016.

2018 

Bishop ran for re-election but lost to Democratic challenger Elissa Slotkin.

Committee assignments
Committee on Education and the Workforce
Subcommittee on Early Childhood, Elementary and Secondary EducationSubcommittee on Workforce Protections
Committee on the Judiciary
Subcommittee on Crime, Terrorism, Homeland Security and Investigations
Subcommittee on Regulatory Reform, Commercial and Antitrust Law
Committee on Ways and Means
Subcommittee on Oversight
Subcommittee on Human Resources

Caucus memberships
 Republican Study Committee
 House Baltic Caucus
Congressional NextGen 9-1-1 Caucus

Political positions

Abortion 
Bishop has voted to ban abortions after 20 weeks and has co-sponsored legislation which states that life starts at conception.

Affordable Care Act 
Bishop disapproves of the ACA and voted to repeal the Affordable Care Act in 2016.

Animal testing 
Bishop has called on the USDA to stop the killing of kittens after being tested on for research.

Gun policy 
Bishop supports gun rights and the Second Amendment, receiving a A/A+ rating from the National Rifle Association.

Gordie Howe International Bridge
When Bishop was Majority Leader of the Michigan Senate, a bill to create the Gordie Howe International Bridge as a companion to the Ambassador Bridge came to him for determination to put it to the Senate floor for a vote. Corporate interests were strongly in favor of the bill, which would partner with Canada to pay for the bridge. Bishop opposed the bridge and did not bring the legislation to a floor vote, saying there were "too many outstanding legal issues and the legislation is too important to push a lame-duck vote." Bishop had received campaign donations from Manuel Moroun, owner of the rival Ambassador Bridge. Governor Rick Snyder, a Republican, found another way to make the deal and the project continued without Bishop's support.

Before being elected to the U.S. House of Representatives he vowed to vote to block the Gordie Howe International bridge. The Livingston Daily reported "A proposal for the federal government to fund a U.S. customs center has stalled. If elected, Bishop said he wouldn't support federal funding of the customs center."

Personal life
Bishop, a resident of Rochester, Michigan, is married and has three children. He is a Congregationalist.

References

External links

 

|-

|-

1967 births
20th-century American politicians
21st-century American politicians
Republican Party members of the United States House of Representatives from Michigan
American Congregationalists
Detroit College of Law alumni
Living people
Republican Party Michigan state senators
Michigan State University College of Law alumni
People from Almont, Michigan
People from Rochester, Michigan
University of Michigan alumni